D. J. Davis may refer to:
D. J. Davis (baseball) (born 1994), baseball player
Drew Davis (American football) (born 1989), also known as D. J. Davis, American football player